Guu or GUU may refer to:

 Glasgow University Union
 Grundarfjörður Airport, in Iceland
 a codon for the amino acid valine
 Yanomamö language
 Guu, a character in Haré+Guu, a manga and anime series